Art competitions formed part of the modern Olympic Games during its early years, from 1912 to 1948.  The competitions were part of the original intention of the Olympic Movement's founder, Pierre de Frédy, Baron de Coubertin.  Medals were awarded for works of art inspired by sport, divided into five categories: architecture, literature, music, painting, and sculpture.

The juried art competitions were abandoned in 1954 because artists were considered to be professionals, while Olympic athletes were required to be amateurs. Since 1956, the Olympic cultural programme has taken their place.

History
With the founding of the International Olympic Committee (IOC) in 1894, and the celebration of the first modern Olympic Games, French Baron Pierre de Coubertin saw the fulfillment of his ideals—men being educated in both mind and body, and competing in sport rather than war. One of his other desires was to combine both art and sport, and he thus considered including artistic competition in the Olympic Games.

In May 1906, Baron de Coubertin organised a meeting in Paris for both IOC members and representatives of artists' organisations. The meeting ended with a proposal to the IOC to organise artistic competitions at the Olympic Games in five areas (architecture, literature, music, painting, and sculpture). The works of art entered had to be inspired by sports.

Preparations were underway to hold such competitions at the 1908 Summer Olympics, which were scheduled for Rome, Italy. But the Italian organisers were faced with financial troubles due to the Vesuvius eruption of 1906, and were forced to halt preparations, and the IOC awarded the organisation to London in 1907. The British organisers planned to hold the art competitions, but because of the short preparation time, they were cancelled. The organisers felt that artists would not have enough time to send in their works.

Pierre de Coubertin was not discouraged, and sought to include the artistic events in the programme of the 1912 Summer Olympics, to be held in Stockholm, Sweden. Although the Swedes initially objected, opposing the idea of art combined with competition, they eventually gave in. The number of entrants was rather disappointing: only 35 artists are known to have sent works of art to Sweden, but gold medals were awarded in all five categories.

When the first post-war Olympic Games were held in war-ravaged Belgium, art contests were again on the programme, although they were little more than a sideshow. This was different for the 1924 Summer Olympics in Paris. The contests were taken seriously for the first time, and 193 artists submitted works. This figure included three Soviet artists, even though the Soviet Union officially did not take part in the Olympic Games, which they considered to be a "bourgeois" festival.

The growth continued at the 1928 Amsterdam Olympics, where over 1,100 works of art were exhibited in the Municipal Museum, not including the submissions in literature, music and architecture. Artists were allowed to sell their works at the close of the exhibition, which was rather controversial given the IOC's amateurism policy, which required all competitors to be amateurs. In Amsterdam, the number of events was also increased, as four of the five fields of art were subdivided, creating more events.

Because of the economy and the remote location of Los Angeles, participation in the athletic events of the 1932 Games was lower than that of 1928. The art competition did not suffer from this problem, and the number of art works entered remained stable. Their exhibition drew 384,000 visitors to the Los Angeles Museum of History, Science and Art. Art contests were also held in Berlin (1936) and London (1948), with reasonable success, although the number of entered works had significantly dropped by 1948.

In 1949, a report was presented at the IOC meeting in Rome which concluded that practically all contestants in the art competitions were professionals, and that the competitions should therefore be abolished and replaced with an exhibition without awards or medals. This sparked a heated debate within the IOC. At a 1951 meeting, the IOC decided to reinstate the competitions for the 1952 Olympics in Helsinki. However, the organisers claimed there was insufficient time, and an art competition was not held. An art exhibition took place in its stead.

The issue continued to be debated within the Olympic Movement, and at the 49th IOC Session in Athens, 1954, the IOC members voted to replace the art contests with an exhibition for future Olympics. Several attempts have been made to re-include them, but without success.

Despite no longer holding art competitions, the Olympic games continue to be connected with art exhibitions. The Olympic Charter required organisers of the Olympic Games to include a programme of cultural events, to "serve to promote harmonious relations, mutual understanding and friendship among the participants and others attending the Olympic Games".

Competition
From 1912 to 1948 rules of the art competition varied, but the core of the rules remained the same. All of the entered works had to be inspired by sport, and had to be original (that is, not be published before the competition). Like in the athletic events at the Olympics, gold, silver, and bronze medals were awarded to the highest ranked artists, although not all medals were awarded in each competition. On a few occasions, in fact, no medals were presented at all.

Generally, it was permitted for artists to enter multiple works, although a maximum number was sometimes established. This made it possible for an artist to win multiple prizes in a single competition.

At one time or another, there were suggestions to also include dancing, film, photography, or theatre, but none of these art forms was ever included in the Olympic Games as a medal event.  However, breakdancing will be included in the Paris 2024 Olympics.

Architecture

Until the Amsterdam Games in 1928, the architectural competition was not divided into categories. The 1928 games introduced a town planning category. However, the division was not always clear, and some designs were awarded prizes in both categories.

Entries in this category were allowed to have been "published" before the Olympics. A notable example of this is the 1928 gold medal for architecture awarded to Jan Wils for his design of the Olympic Stadium used in the same Olympics.

Literature
The literature competitions were divided into a varied number of categories. Until 1924 and again in 1932, there was only a single literature category. In 1928, separate categories were introduced for dramatic, epic, and lyric literature. Awards in these categories were also presented in 1948, while the drama category was dropped in 1936.

Entered works were limited in length (20,000 words) and could be submitted in any language, provided they were accompanied by English and/or French translations or summaries (rules varied over the years).

Music
A single event for music was held until 1936, when three categories were introduced: one for orchestral music, one for instrumental music, and one for both solo and choral music. In 1948, these categories were slightly modified into choral/orchestral, instrumental/chamber, and vocal music.

The juries often had trouble judging the pieces, which were entered on paper. Possibly related to the problematic judging, juries frequently decided to award only a few prizes. On two occasions, no award was given out at all (in the 1924 music category and in the 1936 instrumental music category).

1936 marked the only occasion when the winning musical works were actually played before an audience.

Josef Suk is the only well-known musician to have competed, winning a silver medal in 1932.

Painting

As with the other art forms, a single painting category was on the program until 1928, when it was split out into three sub-categories: drawings, graphic arts, and paintings. The categories then changed at each of the following Olympic Games. In 1932, the three categories were: paintings, prints, and watercolors/drawings. Four years later, the prints category had disappeared, and had been replaced by graphic arts and commercial graphic art. At the final Olympic art competition, the three categories were applied arts and crafts, engravings/etchings, and oils/water colours.

Sculpture
The sculpture class had only a single category until 1928, when two separate competitions were designated; one for statues and one for reliefs and medals. In 1936, this was split up further, separating reliefs and medals into their own categories.

Notable competitors
While several of the Olympic art medalists have achieved at least national fame, few of them can be considered well-known artists globally. In fact, the 1924 Games featured better-known jury members than artists, with artists like Selma Lagerlöf and Igor Stravinsky judging the entered works.

Judging by the medals won, Luxembourg painter Jean Jacoby is the most successful Olympic artist, winning the gold medal for his 1924 painting Étude de Sport, and for his drawing Rugby in 1928. Swiss artist Alex Diggelmann won three medals, a gold one in 1936 (for his poster Arosa I Placard), and a silver and a bronze in the 1948 applied arts & crafts class, both with commercial posters. Danish writer Josef Petersen won a silver medal on three occasions: in 1924, 1932, and 1948.

Only two persons have won Olympic medals in both sport and art competitions. Walter W. Winans, an American who lived in England, won a gold medal as a marksman at the 1908 Summer Olympics in the running deer (double shot) competition. In 1912, he won another shooting medal—silver this time—in the running deer team competition. By then, he had already won a gold medal for his sculpture An American trotter. The other Olympian with successes in both fields is Alfréd Hajós of Hungary. As a swimmer, he won two gold medals at the 1896 Athens Olympics. Twenty-eight years later, he was awarded a silver medal in architecture for his stadium design, co-designed with Dezső Lauber.

Two presidents of the International Olympic Committee have also been among the entrants in the Olympic art competitions. In 1912 Pierre de Coubertin, under the pseudonym "Georges Hohrod and Martin Eschbach", entered Ode to sport, which won the gold medal. Avery Brundage, who competed as an athlete at the 1912 Games, entered literary works at the 1932 and 1936 Olympics, earning an honorary mention in 1932. He would serve as the IOC's president from 1952 to 1972.

Britain's John Copley, winner of a silver medal in the 1948 engravings and etchings competition, was 73 years of age, making him the oldest Olympic medallist in history. The oldest Olympic medallist outside the art competitions is Swedish shooter Oscar Swahn, who won his last medal at age 72.

All-time medal table (1912–1948)

Winners by Olympics
Stockholm 1912 (5)
Antwerp 1920 (5)
Paris 1924 (5)
Amsterdam 1928 (13)
Los Angeles 1932 (9)
Berlin 1936 (15)
London 1948 (14)

See also
Jeux de la Francophonie
List of LGBT artists at the Olympic Games

References

 (Book in French) Guillain Jean-Yves, Art & Olympisme. Histoire du concours de peinture, Paris, Atlantica, 2004. .

 
Discontinued sports at the Summer Olympics